Children of Light is the fourth published novel by U. S. writer Robert Stone. It was published in 1986.

Background
In the front matter of the published version of the novel, Stone acknowledges that during the writing of this novel he received assistance from the National Endowment for the Arts and a residency at the Villa Serbelloni.

Portions of this novel were originally published in Esquire, The Paris Review, Playboy, and TriQuarterly.

Brief synopsis
The story tracks the lives of Gordon Walker, a failed playwright in his 40s and modestly successful screenwriter-actor, and his old flame Lee Verger, the stage name of Lu Anne Bourgeois Morgen, a successful actress who has paranoid schizophrenia. Gordon, an alcoholic drug addict whose second wife has just left him, goes on location to Mexico where they're filming Walker's screenplay which is an adaptation of Kate Chopin's The Awakening that Lu Anne is starring in. Walker discovers that she has gone off of her medication in an attempt to more fully embody her character.

References

1986 American novels
Works by Robert Stone (novelist)
Alfred A. Knopf books
Novels about actors
Novels set in Mexico
Novels about alcoholism
Novels about mental health
Hollywood novels